The Best of the Best is the third compilation album by Slovak singer-songwriter Marika Gombitová and her first featuring two compact discs, released on OPUS in 1998.

Track listing

Official releases
 1998: The Best of the Best, 2CD, Open Music #0065 2312

Credits and personnel

 Marika Gombitová - lead vocal, writer
 Václav Patejdl - music
 Ján Lehotský - music
 Ján Lauko - music, producer
 Pavol Hammel - music
 Andrej Šeban - music

 Kamil Peteraj - lyrics
 Karel Gott - lead vocal
 Milan Vašica - producer
 Peter Breiner - producer
 Peter Smolinský - producer
 Július Kinček - notes

References

General

Specific

External links 
 

1998 compilation albums
Marika Gombitová compilation albums